Ryan Freeze (born May 19, 1995) is a Canadian curler from Saint John, New Brunswick.

Career
Freeze won the 2014 New Brunswick Junior Curling Championship. He played with Rene Comeau, Daniel Wenzek and Jordon Craft at the 2014 Canadian Junior Curling Championships. They finished the round robin with a 5–1 record and the championship pool with a 7–3 record, qualifying them for the semifinal. They breezed past Alberta to face Manitoba in the gold medal game. The teams were even in percentages however Manitoba had a key steal of four which was ultimately the difference in the game. New Brunswick earned the silver medal.

Freeze would win the provincial championship again in 2015 this time with a new set of players Andrew Burgess, Alex MacNeil and Comeau still skipping. The team had an identical start as Comeau and Freeze did in 2014, going 5–1 in the round robin but improving in the championship pool, finishing 8–2. The team would unfortunately not reach the final this year, losing to Saskatchewan 8–6 in the semifinal. The following season, Team Comeau played in the 2015 GSOC Tour Challenge Tier 2 event, where they finished 1–3.

Teams

References

External links

Curlers from New Brunswick
Living people
1995 births
Canadian male curlers
Sportspeople from Saint John, New Brunswick
21st-century Canadian people